Michael Porter (born Kim Michael Porter, January 14, 1951 – October 23, 2010) was an American professional wrestling ring announcer and internet radio host.

Porter was born in Gridley, California, and began his career in 1969 in the San Francisco Bay Area and Sacramento region working under the guidance of legendary promoters Roy Shire, Louie Miller and Terry Garvin.  Porter was best known for working as a house show ring announcer for the World Wrestling Federation (now World Wrestling Entertainment) from 1988 to 1993 (mostly on the west coast, including the historic Cow Palace in San Francisco, Oakland-Alameda County Coliseum Arena - now Oracle Arena - in Oakland and ARCO Arena - now Sleep Train Arena - in Sacramento).  He worked security at WrestleMania VII at the Los Angeles Sports Arena in 1991.

He had announced for such independent feds such as the United Wrestling Alliance (Marysville, California) in 2002-2003, Pro Championship Wrestling (Oroville, California) in 2006 and Devil Mountain Wrestling (Martinez, California) in 2007-2008.  Porter hosted a pro wrestling interview program Michael Porter's WrestleShoot, which started as a weekend radio show on Marysville, California, radio station KMYC-AM 1410 and aired there during 2004 and 2005.  The show was later broadcast  on the internet radio network, Blog Talk Radio.  Porter interviewed varying levels of talent from independent stars to members of the WWE Hall of Fame. He also co-hosted the popular Cloverleaf Radio on the same channel.

Porter remained close friends with many WWE stars like Rowdy Roddy Piper, Koko B. Ware, Jimmy "Superfly" Snuka, Honky Tonk Man and Mean Gene Okerlund.

Porter died on October 23, 2010, at his home in Hollywood, California.  He was suffering through various health problems from obesity to diabetes and was a two-time cancer survivor.

Good friends of Porter's, internet radio host Wacko Bob (Robert Guercia) & indy pro wrestler Rick Ryder would reunite with their old wrestling internet radio show The Dark Match on Blog Talk Radio and pay tribute to him only a few days after his death with The Stro and Bill Apter as guests on the show.

Michael Porter's WrestleShoot
On June 22, 2008, after co-hosting Cloverleaf Radio and The Dark Match for a number of months, and after a one-year stint on KMYC-AM radio in the 1990's, Porter relaunched his radio program Michael Porter's WrestleShoot on internet radio using the service Blog Talk Radio.  He interviewed personalities from independent wrestlers to hall of famers and became a featured program on BTR until his death in 2010.  On October 23, 2012, exactly two years after his death, Michael Porter's WrestleShoot returned to BTR with close friends Mike Summers (now of Action Video Entertainment of Mt. Shasta, California, and Action VR Network of Coconut Creek, Florida) and Paula Jo Schaber as hosts and producers.  (Schaber has since passed away and "Wacko" Bob Guercia now serves as co-host and producer.)  The program aired on Sundays on BTR and also spawned a spin-off program called RollerShoot, a program devoted to roller derby.  On August 5, 2013, Michael Porter's WrestleShoot ended its five-year run with BTR with its final program by re-airing the pilot from 2008.   The program returned to internet radio on its new home, The Wacko Radio Network (now Action VR Network), on December 4, 2016, now airing on Mixlr.  In 2017, repeats and marathons of the program began airing on Action VR 2.  Summers, Guercia as The Star Wacko Bob (A Heel Persona), former wrestler "Pretty Boy" Doug Masters and former WWE Tough Enough participant Brian Danovich (until his passing) served as hosts until the last all-new episode on May 31, 2020.

Career highlights
World Wrestling Federation
Ring Announcer/Security/Ring Crew (House shows and WrestleMania VII, 1988-1993)
United Wrestling Alliance 
UWA Commissioner (2003)
UWA Hardcore Champion (2003)
Pro Championship Wrestling
Ring Announcer (2005)
Devil Mountain Wrestling
Ring Announcer (2007)

References

External links
 Michael Porter's WrestleShoot on Blog Talk Radio
 Cloverleaf Radio on Blog Talk Radio
 "The Dark Match" Tribute to Michael Porter
 AVE Radio Network on Blog Talk Radio
 Action VR Network on Mixlr

Professional wrestling announcers
2010 deaths
1951 births
People from Gridley, California